This is a list of ports of the North Sea and its influent rivers.

Note: this list does not include ports on the Skagerrak, the Kattegat, or the English Channel.

Belgium

Denmark

France
Dunkerque

Germany

Netherlands

Norway

United Kingdom

See also
 Channel Ports
 History of London - port of London
 Geography of Germany - Water transport

References

 
North Sea